James Augustine McFaul (June 6, 1850 – June 16, 1917) was an Irish-born prelate of the Roman Catholic Church. He served as bishop of the Diocese of Trenton in New Jersey from 1894 until his death in 1917.

Biography

Early life 
James McFaul was born on June 6, 1850, in Larne, County Antrim in Ireland, to James and Mary (née Hefferman) McFaul. The family moved to the United States when he was an infant, residing in New York City for four years before settling in Bound Brook, New Jersey. James McFaul worked on his father's farm and at age 15 became a clerk at a country store near Bound Brook. 

With the intention of becoming a lawyer, McFaul attended Saint Vincent College in Latrobe, Pennsylvania, from 1867 to 1871. He completed his classical studies at St. Francis Xavier College in New York City in 1873, and then studied theology at Seton Hall College in South Orange, New Jersey.

Priesthood 
McFaul was ordained to the priesthood by Archbishop Michael Corrigan on May 26, 1877. He then served as a curate at St. Patrick's Cathedral in Newark until 1879, when he was transferred to St. Mary's Cathedral in Trenton. He was named private secretary to Bishop Michael J. O'Farrell in 1882, and pastor of the Church of St. Mary, Star of the Sea Parish at Long Branch in 1884. 

In October 1890, McFaul returned to St. Mary's Cathedral as its rector. Having served as O'Farrell's secretary and chancellor of the diocese, he was appointed as vicar general by O'Farrell on November 1, 1892. Upon O'Farrell's death in April 1894, McFaul was named the apostolic administrator of the diocese by the Holy See.

Bishop of Trenton 
On July 20, 1894, McFaul was appointed the second bishop of  the Diocese of Trenton by Pope Leo XIII. He received his episcopal consecration on October 18, 1894, from Archbishop Corrigan, with Bishops Charles McDonnell and Bernard McQuaid serving as co-consecrators. 

During his tenure, McFaul helped erect many churches, schools, and institutions in New Jersey, including an orphanage at Hopewell, a home for senior citizens at Lawrenceville, and Mount St. Mary's College at Plainfield. He was also one of the key organizers of the American Federation of Catholic Societies. In 1909, McFaul created a controversy when he accused the professors at American colleges and universities of an "upbuilding of a cynicism and intimacy with immoral ideas."

James McFaul died at his official residence in Trenton on June 16, 1917, aged 67.

References

External links
 

1850 births
1917 deaths
People from County Antrim
19th-century Irish people
Irish emigrants to the United States (before 1923)
People from Bound Brook, New Jersey
Seton Hall University alumni
Roman Catholic bishops of Trenton
19th-century Roman Catholic bishops in the United States
20th-century Roman Catholic bishops in the United States
Burials in New Jersey